Macrothyatira labiata is a moth in the family Drepanidae first described by Max Gaede in 1930. It is found in Myanmar, China (Sichuan, Yunnan) and Thailand. The Global Lepidoptera Names Index has this name as a synonym of Macrothyatira oblonga.

References

Moths described in 1930
Thyatirinae
Moths of Asia